Wolbero (died 1167) was a Benedictine abbot of St Pantaleon Abbey, Cologne. He is known for his commentary on the Song of Songs, the first to be addressed to a female audience (nuns of Nonnenwerth).

References
David S. Chamberlain,  Wolbero of Cologne (d. 1167): A Zenith of Musical Imagery, Medieval Studies 33 (1971), pp. 114–126

Notes

1167 deaths
German Benedictines
German biblical scholars
Year of birth unknown
German abbots